Khiwai is a town and nagar panchayat situated in the Saroorurpur khurda  Block of sardhana tehsil Meerut District in Uttar Pradesh, India. It is located at a distance of 7.916 kilometres from the Mandal headquarters at Sarurpur Khurd, and is 26.16 kilometres from the district headquarters at Meerut. The population, according to the 2011 Census of India was 21,049 and the village is largely Muslim.

At the entrance of Khiwai town is a Mata Shakumbhari Devi Temple, one government school adjacent to it and other one on the other side of crossroad of Khiwai's entrance.
Although a large number of population is Sunni Muslims having roots of Rajput Hindu and called as "Raangad"; But there are only Hindu Rajput families at the outskirts of Town. 90% of Hindu Rajputs are of Chauhan Dynasty and Sh. Nyadar Singh Chauhan and Shri Motiram Singh Chauhan has most influential family tree in this town. They have also contributed in various schools and in development of this town since 1950. And it was continued by the next generation. 
There is a famous Shiv temple and Baba Deep Chand Maharaj Shrine in village.

References 

Villages in Meerut district